Stanley is an unincorporated community in Isanti Township, Isanti County, Minnesota, United States.

Stanley is located east of Cambridge at the junction of Lever Street NE and 321st Avenue NE.

Nearby is Lake Fannie, also spelled Lake Fanny.

Isanti County Roads 12 and 19; and State Highway 95 (MN 95) are also nearby.

References

 Mn/DOT map of Isanti County – 2013 edition

Unincorporated communities in Minnesota
Unincorporated communities in Isanti County, Minnesota